Leo Jakobson (born 23 September 1953) is an Estonian curler and sport personnel. He is the father of curling in Estonia.

He was born in Tartu. In 1977 he graduated from Estonian Agricultural University.

In 2000 he introduced curling in Estonia first time. He is also one of the founders of the first curling hall in Estonia. He has played curling since 2001. He has competed at the European Curling Championships. In 2010 he won Estonian championships. In 2004–2010 he was a member of Estonian national curling team.

In 2003–2014 he was a member of the board of Estonian Curling Association.

References

External links

Living people
1953 births
Estonian male curlers
Estonian curling champions
Estonian University of Life Sciences alumni
Sportspeople from Tartu